Sehgal, Saigal, Sahgal, or Saigol is a Punjabi Khatri surname, originating from Punjab in India and Pakistan.

Notable people

Art 
Amarnath Sehgal, Indian sculptor. He was awarded the Padma Bhushan.
Deep Sehgal, British filmmaker
Kabir Sehgal, Multi Grammy winning composer, American navy officer and financial executive.
Ikram Sehgal, Pakistani Army officer and defence analyst
Ramesh Saigal,  Indian film director, producer, screenwriter and actor
Nayantara Sahgal, Indian author
Tino Sehgal, Indian British-German artist

Business 

 Vivek Chaand Sehgal, Indian-Australian billionaire businessman and entrepreneur.

Entertainment 

 Aditi Saigal "Dot", Indian actress
 Akashdeep Saigal, Indian TV actor, BiggBoss contestant
 Amit Saigal, Indian rock musician
 Baba Sehgal, rapper and actor
 Dhruv Sehgal, actor and director
 K. L. Saigal (1904-1947), Indian actor and singer
 Mohit Sehgal, Indian actor
 Shashikala Saigal, Indian actress
 Sonal Sehgal, television actress

Freedom struggle 

 Lakshmi Sahgal (1914-2012), Indian Independence revolutionary
 Manmohini Zutshi Sahgal, Indian freedom fighter
Prem Sahgal, Indian independence activist, served in Azad Hind Fauj

Law and journalism 

 Parul Sehgal, he is a former senior editor and columnist at The New York Times Book Review.
 Sabina Sehgal, Indian food journalist, restaurant reviewer, and editor for the Delhi Times

 Sangita Dhingra Sehgal, former Judge of Delhi High Court

Politics 

 Amar Singh Sahgal, Indian politician

Science 

 Amita Sehgal, molecular biologist at University of Pennsylvania. She was involved in the discovery of Drosophila TIM and other important components of the Drosophila clock mechanism
 Narender K. Sehgal, Indian physicist, scientific administrator, and science populariser.
 Sunil Saigal, Indian-born American engineer, former dean of the Newark College of Engineering at New Jersey Institute of Technology
 Suri Sehgal, crop scientist, seedsman, philanthropist

Sports 

 Ravi Sehgal, Indian cricketer

See also
Sahgalabad, a small town in Chakwal District, Punjab, Pakistan
Saigol Group (prononced as Sehgal Group), a group of companies owned by the Saigol family in Pakistan

References

Indian surnames
Pakistani names
Punjabi-language surnames
Surnames of Indian origin
Khatri clans
Khatri surnames
Hindu surnames